This is a glossary for the terminology applied in the mathematical theories of Lie groups and Lie algebras. For the topics in the representation theory of Lie groups and Lie algebras, see Glossary of representation theory. Because of the lack of other options, the glossary also includes some generalizations such as quantum group.

Notations:
Throughout the glossary,  denotes the inner product of a Euclidean space E and  denotes the rescaled inner product

A

B

C

D

E

F

G

H

I

J

K

L

N

M

P

Q

R

S

Classical Lie algebras:

Exceptional Lie algebras:

T

U

 Unitarian trick

V

 Verma module

W

References

 
 Erdmann, Karin & Wildon, Mark. Introduction to Lie Algebras, 1st edition, Springer, 2006. 
 Humphreys, James E. Introduction to Lie Algebras and Representation Theory, Second printing, revised. Graduate Texts in Mathematics, 9. Springer-Verlag, New York, 1978. 
 Jacobson, Nathan, Lie algebras, Republication of the 1962 original. Dover Publications, Inc., New York, 1979.  

 Claudio Procesi (2007) Lie Groups: an approach through invariants and representation, Springer, .
.
J.-P. Serre, "Lie algebras and Lie groups", Benjamin (1965) (Translated from French)

Lie Algebra
 
Wikipedia glossaries using description lists